Windthorst is a village in the Canadian province of Saskatchewan within the Rural Municipality of Chester No. 125 and Census Division No. 5.

History 
Windthorst incorporated as a village on August 21, 1907.

Demographics 

Sports
The Kipling/Winthorst Oil Kings of the senior men's Big 6 Hockey League play in the local ice rink.

See also
List of villages in Saskatchewan
List of communities in Saskatchewan

References

Villages in Saskatchewan
Chester No. 125, Saskatchewan
Division No. 5, Saskatchewan